The 1982 WCT World Doubles was a tennis tournament played on indoor carpet courts at Olympia in London, Great Britain that was part of the 1982 World Championship Tennis circuit. It was the tour finals for the doubles season of the WCT Tour section. The tournament was held from January 6 through January 11, 1981.

Final

Doubles

 Heinz Günthardt /  Balázs Taróczy defeated  Kevin Curren /  Steve Denton 6–7, 6–3, 7–5, 6–4

References

World Championship Tennis World Doubles
1982 World Championship Tennis circuit
1982 in English tennis